QX Andromedae (often abbreviated to QX And) is an eclipsing binary in the constellation Andromeda. It varies from a maximum apparent visual magnitude of 11.28 to a minimum of 11.50. Since it is impossible to specify the onset time of the eclipses, it is classified as a W Ursae Majoris variable star. It is also observed as an X-ray source and is a member of the open cluster NGC 752.

System
As a whole, the QX Andromedae system emits light like a stellar blackbody, with a F6 spectral type. The two stars in the system complete an orbit every 9.892 hours; they are so close that their envelopes are touching each other. Their temperature is similar, but they have different radius and mass. Since they belong to an open cluster, the age of this system is equal to the cluster estimated age ( billion years).

Variability

The light curve of QX Andromedae shows almost equal eclipses; the primary eclipse occurs when the less massive star pass in front of the other one. The brightness variations are rather small for this system given the low orbital inclination of 55°.

References

Andromeda (constellation)
Andromedae, QX
J01575777+3748224
W Ursae Majoris variables
Eclipsing binaries